Engraulicypris gariepinus is an African species of freshwater fish in the family Cyprinidae. It is found in the Orange River below the Augrabies Falls. It is sometimes considered conspecific with the river sardine.

References

Engraulicypris
Fish described in 1943